is a railway station located in the city of  Gifu,  Gifu Prefecture,  Japan, operated by the private railway operator Meitetsu.

Lines

Station layout

Kiridōshi Station has two ground-level opposed side platforms connected by a level crossing. The station is unattended.

Platforms

Adjacent stations

|-
!colspan=5|Nagoya Railroad

History
Kiridōshi Station opened on January 21, 1926.

Surrounding area
Gifu Women's High School
Nagamori-Minami Elementary School

See also
 List of Railway Stations in Japan

External links

  

Railway stations in Japan opened in 1926
Stations of Nagoya Railroad
Railway stations in Gifu Prefecture